The 2021 WCT Arctic Cup, a mixed doubles curling event on the World Curling Tour, was held May 27 to 30 at the Taimyr Ice Arena in Dudinka, Russia. It was the final event of the 2020–21 curling season. The total purse for the event was € 20,000. The event was originally scheduled for November 4 to 9, 2020, however, it was moved to the end of May due to the COVID-19 pandemic.

In the final, the reigning Swiss mixed doubles champions Briar Hürlimann and Yannick Schwaller secured a 9–2 victory over the Russian team of Anna Samoylik and Mikhail Vaskov. Hürlimann and Schwaller finished 3–1 through the round robin and defeated the Italian duo of Diana Gaspari and Joël Retornaz 6–4 to advance to the championship game. Samoylik and Vaskov also went 3–1 through the group stage and upset the previously undefeated team of Alina Kovaleva and Sergey Glukhov 10–5 to reach the final. In the third place game, Kovaleva and Glukhov defeated Gaspari and Retornaz 10–5.

Teams
The teams are listed as follows:

Round robin standings
Final Round Robin Standings

Round robin results
All draw times are listed in Krasnoyarsk Standard Time (UTC+07:00).

Draw 1
Thursday, May 27, 16:00

Draw 2
Thursday, May 27, 19:00

Draw 3
Friday, May 28, 12:00

Draw 4
Friday, May 28, 16:00

Draw 5
Friday, May 28, 19:00

Draw 6
Saturday, May 29, 08:30

Draw 7
Saturday, May 29, 11:30

Draw 8
Saturday, May 29, 14:30

Draw 9
Saturday, May 29, 17:30

Draw 10
Saturday, May 29, 20:30

Playoffs
Source:

Semifinals
Sunday, May 30, 10:00

Third place game
Sunday, May 30, 13:00

Final
Sunday, May 30, 13:00

References

External links
World Curling Tour
Official Site

2021 in Russian sport
2021 in curling
May 2021 sports events in Russia
International curling competitions hosted by Russia
Sport in Krasnoyarsk Krai